Thorne is an unincorporated community in Rolette County, in the U.S. state of North Dakota.

History
Thorne was laid out in 1905.  A number of the first settlers being natives of Thorne, England caused the name to be selected. A post office was established at Thorne in 1905, and remained in operation until it was discontinued in 1965.

References

Former municipalities in North Dakota
Unincorporated communities in Rolette County, North Dakota
Populated places established in 1905
1905 establishments in North Dakota
Unincorporated communities in North Dakota